Luise Adelgunde Victorie Gottsched (born Kulmus, 11 April 1713 – 26 June 1762) was a German poet, playwright, essayist, and translator, and is often considered one of the founders of modern German theatrical comedy.

Biography
She was born in Danzig (Gdańsk), Royal Prussia (Crown of Poland). During her lifetime, she was considered one of Europe's leading intellects and one of the most intelligent women of the time.

She became acquainted with her husband, the poet and author Johann Christoph Gottsched, when she sent him some of her own works. He apparently was impressed, and a long correspondence eventually led to marriage. After marriage, Luise continued to write and publish, and was also her husband's faithful helper in his literary labours.

Her uncle was the anatomist Johann Adam Kulmus.

Works
She wrote several popular comedies, of which Das Testament is the best, and translated The Spectator (9 volumes, 1739–1743), Alexander Pope's Rape of the Lock (1744) and other English and French works.  After her death her husband edited her Sämtliche kleinere Gedichte with a memoir (1763).

References

Sources

1713 births
1762 deaths
18th-century German writers
18th-century German women writers
18th-century German women
Writers from Gdańsk
People from Royal Prussia
Translators to German
18th-century German translators